This is a list of episodes from the seventh season of Impractical Jokers.

Episodes

References

External links 
 Official website
 

Impractical Jokers
2018 American television seasons